Conflict management is the process of handling disputes and disagreements between two or more parties. Managing conflict is said to decrease the amount of tension; if a conflict is poorly managed, it can create more issues than the original conflict. 

Conflict can be defined as an encounter between individuals or groups of people who have differing aims, values, expectations, purposes, ideas, etc. Five modes are offered as solutions to managing a conflict, with each mode ranked on scales of assertiveness and cooperativeness. Assertiveness is the extent to which an individual attempts to satisfy their concerns, while cooperativeness is their willingness to satisfy other parties. Studies have been conducted on the modes of conflict management and their effects on relationships.

A model called the "Thomas-Kilmann model" was designed by two psychologists, Kenneth Thomas and Ralph Kilmann. It demonstrates how individuals choose conflict management styles when they handle disagreement. The Thomas-Kilmann model suggests five modes that guide individuals in resolving conflicts. These are collaborating, competing, compromising, accommodating, and avoiding.
  Collaborating means both sides are willing to cooperate and listen to others.
  Competing means standing up for one's rights and defending what one believes is correct.
  Compromising means the parties seek a better, mutually-acceptable solution, finding "a middle ground".
  Accommodating means that one yields to another's point of view.
  Avoiding is where a solution is delayed or avoided altogether.

Background 
Conflict is usually found in an individualistic culture, where competition and individual achievement is stressed over interdependence. Communication is often seen as crucial to maintaining a healthy relationship, and the way one resolves conflict is important to maintaining healthy relationships. 

Thomas and Kilmann proposed five modes of conflict management, developed from 1960 to 1975, which can be used to handle particular conflicts. The United States Institute for Peace has published a free modified version of the Thomas-Kilmann test. In that test collaborating is called problem solving.

Conflict modes 
According to Thomas and Kilmann, there are five modes that are used to resolve conflicts when they arise. These modes can be assessed based on scales of assertiveness and cooperativeness.

Collaborating 
According to Thomas and Kilmann, collaborating is mutual problem solving that aims to satisfy the needs of all parties. This mode ranks high on both the assertiveness and cooperativeness scales. This mode can be facilitated when personal relationships are close, because such individuals are apt to dig deeper to find the root of the conflict and alternate solutions. One learns the other party's insights to try and find a creative solution to the conflict. This mode is best used when one needs an integrative solution, because all parties needs are too important to not be addressed, and because one wants to join together insights, or work through hard feelings in the relationship. However, if time or scale is concerned, collaborative conflict management can be both time-consuming and emotionally draining, due to its intensive nature. Furthermore, to obtain effective results, parties should be well experienced and capable of discussing their needs and wants. This conflict style is not good for solving smaller, more trivial issues due to its in-depth nature.

Competing 
The competing mode is one in which each individual prioritizes their own position; it is assertive and often results in one-sided communication. In this mode the individual will be standing up for their rights, defending their position, or simply trying to win. Competitiveness can exacerbate the initial conflict and potentially harm a close relationship. This mode is typically used when a quick decision needs to be made, when someone needs to protect themselves, or when someone believes their point of view is wholly correct. Participants in this mode may be closed off to accepting others' ideas, and use of this mode does not always arrive at a permanent solution, in fact, it can escalate the issues instead.

Compromising 
Compromising requires making concessions; both parties will give up a goal or need in order to resolve the conflict. This mode is intermediate in terms of assertiveness and cooperativeness. Compromising is similar to collaborating, in that one finds a mutually beneficial solution to the problem. The difference is that compromising does address the issue, but it doesn't seek the root of the conflict, as is done in collaborating. Compromising is used when issues are important but not worth taking an assertive approach, one wants a temporary fix, or when collaboration or competing fail. Some pros of compromising as a mode of conflict management include: all parties can get some form of satisfaction, it facilitates constructive communication, helps maintain relationships, and the group's power dynamics remain the same. On the other hand if there are no boundaries and an unbalanced power dynamic it can be difficult to find a solution. Some negatives of this method may include: if someone is not willing to compromise it does not work, no party is fully satisfied, outcomes are less creative, less passion and effort is involved ("easy way out"), and is more likely a temporary solution.

Accommodating 
Rather than trying to impose one's own point of view, in the accommodating mode an individual satisfies the other parties goals while being unassertive and cooperative. When accommodating, an individual sacrifices their own needs in order to leave the other party content. This can be good in a relational sense, but can also lead to the party that is making sacrifices becoming burnt out. Accommodation can be appropriate when the accommodator knows they are wrong, possibly needs to build up credit for a later situation that may be more important to them, or would rather just keep the peace. Accommodators seek to preserve personal relationships with others. Accommodation often leads to an imbalance in the power dynamic of a relationship, where the person accommodating has less power and their needs are not met. Accommodating can be useful for settling inconsequential and trivial conflicts. Resentment is a possible outcome when accommodation is used to settle conflicts frequently, due to needs consistently not being met. Resulting resentment could be internal, towards the other party, or between parties.

Avoiding 
The avoiding mode simply averts conflict by postponing or steering clear of it.  Often this style is viewed as having low regard for both the issue at hand and your relationship with the other party. This style is unassertive and uncooperative.  Avoiding is stepping out of the way, delaying, or simply avoiding a situation. This mode can be beneficial in moderation, but, eventually, ignoring conflicts could lead to a build up of tension and unhealthy relationships. This mode tends to be adopted when one finds an issue unimportant, the issue could resolve itself in time, or another problem is more pressing. This mode can also be beneficial when emotions are running high, and one or both parties needs time to calm down before addressing the conflict at hand.

Studies on conflict management

Cross-cultural studies 
In a study written in the Management International Review different subcultures in Turkey were studied with regard to the modes of conflict management they prefer to use. Although this study took place in Turkey, it opened up the door for cross-cultural research into conflict management. The study defined each of the five modes as to how it scored with regard to assertiveness and competitiveness: competing is high in assertiveness, collaborating is high in both, accommodating is high in cooperativeness, avoiding is low in both, and compromise is the mid-point. Researchers studied the choice of mode and what influenced that choice, using Schwartz's inventory of value. What they found was that the traditional main culture used the avoiding style, the power-seeking culture preferred competing, and egalitarians chose accommodation. This study shows that there is a correlation between cultures and their chosen modes of conflict management, and not every culture uses only one mode.

First conflict as a relationship milestone 
Relationship theorists study relationships in terms of stages of their development. The first time those in a close relationship encounter conflict and come out of it is a breakthrough in many of those relationships. John Siegert and Glen Stamp write about the "FBF", or First Big Fight, as an episode of conflict where for the first time feelings that may include doubt or disappointment about the relationship are discussed. This event becomes memorable because of its intensity or timing. The intensity of the conflict may put the relationship at risk, and the timing may occur after a couple officially enters a relationship or are clarifying what the relationship is to them. This study was given to over 250 undergraduate communication students at a university, who were split into three categories based upon if they had survived a FBF with their partner, individuals who had not yet had a FBF with their partner, and individuals who had ended a relationship due to the FBF. Interviews of 50 participants were conducted, and those participants were asked open-ended questions about their first FBF, such as where it happened how it could be classified. The results were divided according to the relational circumstance, outcomes and effects of the fight on the relationship, and the difference between those who stayed in the relationships and those who did not. Researchers found that the FBF is a significant turning point that impacted the future of the relationship, either positively or negatively depending on the preliminary circumstances and feelings about the relationship.

Avoiding conflict in marriage 
Conflicts arise frequently in marriages, and a study was conducted on the effect of relational power and an individual's decision to withhold their complaints in order to avoid a conflict. According to Solomon, et al., the first step is deciding whether to voice a complaint or not; this decision is based on the amount of power one's spouse holds over the complaining partner. This is determined by interpersonal power, or the degree of influence one exerts over the other in a relationship through the ability to influence costs and rewards for the partner. Marital schemas are cognitive structures that contain organized knowledge about marriage relationships. This research was conducted by having communication students present a questionnaire, to a married individual, that used six different types of power as independent variables. The dependent variables were the conflicts that were not brought to the spouse's attention. There were a few different results from the findings: the first being that partners felt more comfortable expressing concerns in a relationship where they had more power; the second being that when a spouse shows aggression, more information that could cause conflicts is withheld from them. Marital schemas can foresee what information will be withheld and shapes individuals' decisions on what to express to their spouses.

Application 
The most widely used tool for this is a conflict-type inventory, typically a short questionnaire filled out by a user, with interpretation of the scores given in writing or by an instructor. The point is not to categorize the user, but rather to give him or her a framework in which to assess responses and options. Conflict mode inventories include the Thomas Kilmann and Style Matters: The Kraybill Conflict Style Inventory

References

Dispute resolution